Rhipidarctia rubrovitta is a moth in the family Erebidae. It was described by Per Olof Christopher Aurivillius in 1904 and is found in Angola, Cameroon and the Democratic Republic of the Congo.

References

Arctiidae genus list at Butterflies and Moths of the World of the Natural History Museum

Moths described in 1904
Syntomini